A bicycle seat, unlike a bicycle saddle, is designed to support the rider's buttocks and back, usually in a semi-reclined position. Arthur Garford is credited with inventing the padded bicycle seat in 1892, and they are now usually found on recumbent bicycles.

Bicycle seats come in three main styles; mesh, hardshell and combination

Seat types

Mesh
A typical mesh seat consists of a metal frame with mesh stretched over it and secured with adjustable straps, zip ties, string or shock cord.

Hardshell
Hardshell seats are normally made of a composite material such as GRP or carbon fibre although metal and wood versions do exist.  A hardshell seat is normally covered with some-form of padding, this is usually closed or open cell foam although some extreme racing machines do not have any padding on the seat to reduce weight and increase efficiency. Hardshell seats are generally used at more reclined angles than mesh seats.

Some riders complain of excessive road noise vibrating through the hardshell seat. Also, the hardshell seat is "closed", providing no ventilation, which may cause excessive sweat to build up on the cyclist's back on hot days.

Combination
A combination seat has a padded hard seat base with a mesh back.

See also
 Bicycle saddle
 Saddlebag

Seat
Seats